Little Waldingfield is a village and civil parish in Suffolk, England. Located two miles from its sister village, Great Waldingfield, it is part of the Babergh district, and includes the hamlet of Humble Green.

Around half the village is a designated conservation area, and the parish also contains part of the Milden Thicks SSSI and two of the sources of the River Box.

References

External links

Village website
St Lawrence's Church Suffolk Churches

Villages in Suffolk
Babergh District
Civil parishes in Suffolk